Capitolwire is a prominent online subscription-based news service focusing on issues relating to politics and government in Pennsylvania. The Pennsylvania State Senate and Pennsylvania House of Representatives hold a contracts with GovNetPA to supply access to Capitolwire for selected staff members.

Capitolwire was founded in 1999 and within its first year, it was reported to have 2,000 subscribers. By 2001, the Capitolwire had more than 35 employees and had expanded its coverage area to include New Jersey, New York, Ohio, and Virginia. The company was sold to the Associated Press in 2002. The AP purchased Capitolwire to expand its practice of licensing material to newspapers. In 2005, Capitolwire was purchased by GovNetPA, Inc.

References

External links
Capitolwire home page
Pennsylvania House of Representatives Contract
Pennsylvania House of Representatives Contract
Department of General Services Contract

Newspapers published in Harrisburg, Pennsylvania
Publications established in 1999
Politics of Pennsylvania
American political websites
Internet properties established in 1999
1999 establishments in Pennsylvania